Beatriz is a barrio in the municipality of Caguas, Puerto Rico. Its population in 2010 was 4,353.

Geography
Beatriz is located at the coordinates . According to the United States Census Bureau, Beatriz has a total area of 15.89 km², of which 15.89 km² is land and (0.03%) 0.01 km² is water. Beatriz is located in the Sierra de Cayey, a subrange of the Cordillera Central mountain range, making it one of the barrios of Caguas which are not located in the Caguas Valley. The name of the barrio comes from the Doña Beatriz Creek which crosses it and flows into the Turabo River.

Sectors and demographics 
Barrios (which are roughly comparable to minor civil divisions) in turn are further subdivided into smaller local populated place areas/units called sectores (sectors in English). The types of sectores may vary, from normally sector to urbanización to reparto to barriada to residencial, among others.

The following sectors are in Beatriz:

According to the 2010 Census, there were 4,353 people residing in Beatriz. The population density was 27,391 inhabitants per km². Of 4,353 inhabitants, Beatriz was composed of 68.76% Whites, 13% were Black, 0.62% were American Indian, 0.05% were Asian, 0.02% were Pacific Islanders, 12.27% were of other races and 5.28% belonged to two or more races. In all, the population was 99.47% Hispanic or Latino.

History
Puerto Rico was ceded by Spain in the aftermath of the Spanish–American War under the terms of the Treaty of Paris of 1898 and became an unincorporated territory of the United States. In 1899, the United States Department of War conducted a census of Puerto Rico finding that the population of Beatriz barrio was 868.

The area was mostly made up of subsistence farms in the 19th century. Botanist William Edwin Safford visited Beatriz in 1898 to document the local plant life.

The 1899 San Ciriaco hurricane devastated Beatriz, and many farmers began working for the newly established military government of the United States of America building roads. At the time, a store owned by wealthy landowner Don Ramón Álvarez was the center of economic life in Beatriz. In 1900, one of the store's cashiers Don Demetrio López was elected alcalde and comisario of Beatriz.

Beatriz barrio was hit by Hurricane Maria on 20 September 2017 and many residents still did not have electricity as of March 2018, six months later.

Landmarks and places of interest 

 Carretera Central, the historic road connecting San Juan in the north to Ponce in the south passes through Beatriz.
 Centro Los Panes, a community center near La Jurado sector.
 Cerro Las Piñas, a hill located in the boundary with Beatriz, Cayey which offers panoramic views of the Caguas Valley and its surrounding mountains.

See also
 List of communities in Puerto Rico

References

External links 
 Caguas government site

Barrios of Caguas, Puerto Rico